Group A of the 2019 Africa Cup of Nations took place from 21 to 30 June 2019. The group consisted of DR Congo, hosts Egypt, Uganda and Zimbabwe.

Egypt and Uganda as the top two teams, along with DR Congo as one of the four best third-placed teams, advanced to the round of 16.

Teams

Notes

Standings

In the round of 16:
 The winners of Group A, Egypt, advanced to play the third-placed team of Group D, South Africa.
 The runners-up of Group A, Uganda, advanced to play the runners-up of Group C, Senegal.
 The third-placed team of Group A, DR Congo, advanced to play the winners of Group B, Madagascar.

Matches

Egypt vs Zimbabwe

DR Congo vs Uganda

Uganda vs Zimbabwe

Egypt vs DR Congo

Uganda vs Egypt

Zimbabwe vs DR Congo

References

External links
 

2019 Africa Cup of Nations